Women's Giant Slalom World Cup 1988/1989

Calendar

Final point standings

In Women's Giant Slalom World Cup 1988/89 all results count.

References
 fis-ski.com

World Cup
FIS Alpine Ski World Cup women's giant slalom discipline titles